Owen ap Hugh (1518–1613), of Bodeon, near Llangadwaladr, Anglesey was a Welsh politician.

He was a Member (MP) of the Parliament of England for Newborough in 1545. He was High Sheriff of Anglesey from 1563 to 1580.

He was the eldest son and heir of Hugh ap Owen and Gwenllian ferch Maurice. He married Sibill Griffith, daughter of Sir William Griffith and Jane Puleston.

References

1518 births
1613 deaths
16th-century Welsh politicians
People from Anglesey
High Sheriffs of Anglesey
English MPs 1545–1547
Members of the Parliament of England (pre-1707) for constituencies in Wales